World Trade Center Gibraltar is a World Trade Centers Association (WTCA) office complex located in Gibraltar.  The WTCA approved the establishment of the WTC Gibraltar at the conclusion of its Annual General Assembly in Beijing, China, in October 2010.

The , seven-storey
 WTC Gibraltar building was officially opened on 15 February 2017 by Fabian Picardo, Chief Minister of Gibraltar, and Dr Joseph Garcia, Deputy Chief Minister with a 97% occupancy / reservation rate. Constructed adjacent to Ocean Village, a mixed use marina complex, it includes a Regus Business Centre, state-of-the-art telecommunications, high speed lifts, climate control, electronic security access, CCTV, parking, two food and beverage outlets, a creche, and a print services operation.

References

Gibraltar
Economy of Gibraltar
Buildings and structures in Gibraltar